Babbloo Prithiveeraj (born 29 November 1965) is an Indian actor, who has appeared in Tamil, Telugu and Kannada language films.

Career
Prithveeraj made his acting debut as a child artiste and featured in films including Naan Vazhavaippen (1979), under the stage name of Babloo. He made a comeback as an actor in the 1980s by acting in some low budget Malayalam movies before starring in Vaaname Ellai directed by K.Balachander. He then started acting in negative roles in movies like Aval Varuvaala before entering tele serials. In the 2000s, he played crucial roles in the serials Ramany vs Ramany and the supernatural thriller Marma Desam, both directed by Naga. These serials gained him a breakthrough, while he also hosted the show Savaal in Jaya TV. He then appeared as transgender goon Ganga in Raadhika’s serial Arasi, before continuing to act further in the serials Raja Rajeshwari and Vani Rani.

As film offers became less frequent, Prithveeraj spent a year competing as a part of the dance reality show, Jodi Number One during its second season. During the show, he was involved in an on-air altercation with actor and show judge Silambarasan. Since 2010, he has predominantly concentrated on television roles and has featured as a lead character in the soap, Vani Rani. In 2014, he set up a bubble tea shop, Cha Republic, in Besant Nagar, Chennai after being inspired to set up a store following a visit to Malaysia.

Personal life
Prithveeraj was married to Beena in 1994, and they have a son named Ahed Mohan Jabbar and couple separated 2022 In November 2022, Prithvi introduced Sheetal as his to be wife, whom working as HR in Software Company in Bangalore.

Filmography
Films

Television
Serials

Shows

Awards
 Nandi Award for Best Villain - Pelli (1997) 
 Sun Kudumbam Viruthugal (Best Supporting Male Actor)- Vani Rani (2014)

References

External links
 

Living people
1966 births
Male actors in Tamil cinema
Male actors in Telugu cinema
Male actors in Hindi cinema
Male actors in Kannada cinema
Tamil male television actors
Tamil television presenters
Television personalities from Tamil Nadu
Male actors from Tamil Nadu
21st-century Tamil male actors
Tamil Reality dancing competition contestants
Nandi Award winners
21st-century Indian male actors
Indian male child actors